Lopatka or Łopatka (Czech/Slovak feminine: Lopatková) is a surname. Notable people with the surname include:

 Art Lopatka (1919–2007), American baseball player
 Mieczysław Łopatka (born 1939), Polish basketball player and coach
 Sharon Lopatka (1961–1996), American murder victim

See also
 
 Cape Lopatka

Surnames of Czech origin
Surnames of Polish origin
Surnames of Slovak origin